Johnny Brown (June 11, 1937 – March 2, 2022) was an American actor and singer. He was most famous for his role as building superintendent Nathan Bookman on the 1970s CBS sitcom, Good Times. Brown portrayed Bookman until the series was cancelled in 1979.

Life and career
A nightclub promoter and performer, his early best role was as a regular cast member of the television series Laugh-in.  Brown is mostly remembered for his portly physique, beautiful smile, mobile facial expressions, and easy, pleasant joking style.

Brown made appearances on The Flip Wilson Show, ‘‘ Punky Brewster’’, The Jeffersons, Family Matters, Sister, Sister, The Jamie Foxx Show, The Wayans Bros, and Martin.  He had a recurring role as building super Nathan Bookman in the 1970's TV series Good Times. He had a small role in the 1970 film The Out-of-Towners starring Jack Lemmon and Sandy Dennis as a waiter on a railroad dining car. Brown went to school with Walter Dean Myers when he lived in Harlem, New York City as a boy.

Brown also appeared in several television commercials, including ads for Hunt's Manwich and the Write Brothers pen, a short-lived product of the Papermate pen company in the 1970s. The commercial consisted of an elaborate musical number, "Write On, Brothers, Write On", led by Brown as a schoolteacher who encourages his chorus line of students to use this pen for their school assignments.

In 1997, Brown contributed his voice to the introduction of the compilation album Comedy Stew: The Best of Redd Foxx.  In the introduction, Brown tells of how Norman Lear had considered Brown to play the role of Lamont in Sanford and Son, but was unavailable to do so because of his prior commitment to Laugh-In, leading Lear to give the role to Demond Wilson instead. He also had a one-off role as "Fat-Man" in the original The Ghost Busters television show.

In 1999, Brown appeared on two episodes of the Nickelodeon children's sitcom Kenan & Kel.

He played Wallace "Suitcase" Jefferson in the 2004 mockumentary The Old Negro Space Program.

Death
Brown died in Los Angeles on March 2, 2022, at the age of 84. He collapsed shortly after leaving a doctor's appointment for his pacemaker and was pronounced dead when brought to hospital.

Records

Brown began recording as a singer as late as 1961, after having toured with Sam "The Man" Taylor since 1958. His first release was on Columbia Records, "Walkin', Talkin', Kissin' Doll" b/w "Sundown" in February 1961. He was only 23 at the time. The promotional release was accompanied with a special insert describing his background (see picture). His next record happened in early 1968 on Atlantic Records, "You're Too Much in Love With Yourself" b/w "Don't Dilly Dally, Dolly", the latter showing off his impression skills as Louis Armstrong. That release had initially been available on Crest Records.

References

External links
 
 
 

1937 births
2022 deaths
African-American male actors
American impressionists (entertainers)
American male film actors
American male television actors
American sketch comedians
Male actors from Florida
20th-century African-American male singers
Musicians from St. Petersburg, Florida
21st-century African-American people